The Cape Government Railways Fairlie  of 1876 was a South African steam locomotive from the pre-Union era in the Cape of Good Hope.

In 1876, the Cape Government Railways placed a single experimental  Double Fairlie side-tank locomotive in service on the Cape Eastern system, working out of East London. It was the first articulated locomotive to enter service in South Africa and also the first locomotive in South Africa to be equipped with Walschaerts valve gear. After some shortcomings were brought to the attention of the locomotive builders, a second Double Fairlie which incorporated most of these improvements was delivered and placed in service in 1878.

Manufacturer
To satisfy the requirement for more powerful locomotives on the Eastern System of the Cape Government Railways due to the heavy grades on the mainline out of East London, a single  Double Fairlie tank locomotive was acquired for experimental purposes in 1876. It was built by the Avonside Engine Company and supplied through the Crown Agents for the Colonies. When it was shipped from England, the locomotive was accompanied by Mr. Edmund Roberts, a specialist engine driver who had gained considerable experience on Double Fairlie locomotives in Peru.

The Fairlie locomotive
The Fairlie locomotive was invented by a Scottish engineer, Robert Francis Fairlie, and patented on 12 May 1864. In general appearance, the locomotive is reminiscent of the German-built Zwillinge (twins) of 1898, which saw service on the narrow gauge lines in German South West Africa and other German territories. However, while the Zwillinge were pairs of individual locomotives which were semi-permanently coupled back-to-back, the Double Fairlie was a single "two-faced" locomotive with either a double-ended boiler or two separate boilers and with smokeboxes at each end, a central firebox and a central cab, all mounted on one rigid frame. It ran on two pivoting engine units or powered bogies, similar to those of a Garratt locomotive, with the cylinders on each engine unit at the respective locomotive ends. Couplers, buffers and, where they were in use, cowcatchers were mounted on the engine unit bogies so that they could more accurately follow the curvature of the track.

Characteristics
The Double Fairlie was the first articulated locomotive to enter service in South Africa and also the first to have Walschaerts valve gear, which had been invented in 1844 by Belgian locomotive foreman Egide Walschaerts. The locomotive which was acquired by the CGR was of the separate boiler type. It had two boiler barrels, with a central firebox common to both barrels and fired from the side. The buffing and drawgear were fitted on the two engine units. The pivots were located under the two boiler saddles and were carried on centre bearings which formed part of the engine unit frames.

The steam pipes were routed across the front tube-plates into fittings which formed a prolongation of the bottom part of the smokeboxes. From there, steam passed through a swivelling and sliding joint to the cylinders. The exhaust pipes back to the smokeboxes were equipped with ball and socket joints.

Due to its uncomfortable and cramped cab, the locomotive was unpopular with the crews. The side-fired central firebox resulted in very cramped workspace for the fireman. Since the driver worked isolated on the other side of the firebox, the men would be unable to reach each other in the event of an emergency. In addition, the fireman could only clean the grate while the engine was stopped.

Locomotive trials
The locomotive was placed in service between East London and Belstone on the King William's Town line. At the same time, a pair of Stephenson's Patent permanently coupled back-to-back  locomotives was placed in service on the Cape Eastern system. They also worked out of East London, in comparative trials with the Double Fairlie locomotive. Each type took three trial trains, running alternately.

Both types performed well on curves and while climbing inclines, but the Double Fairlie was the superior engine when descending inclines, where it gave a smoother ride. The Double Fairlie also proved to be more economical on coal and water, but it had an inadequate coal and water carrying capacity. The poor quality coal from Indwe and Molteno, with a high ash content and a tendency to clinker, had an equally negative effect on the performance of both types.

Some shortcomings of the Double Fairlie were identified during the trials. In his report to the manufacturer, Locomotive Superintendent John D. Tilney of the Cape Eastern system proposed four modifications:
 The water carrying capacity had to be increased, either by using longer side tanks or by adding a water tender to the locomotive.
 The ball and socket joints should be equipped with Roscoe lubricators.
 The sandboxes, which were mounted on the bogie frames, were ineffective and required much too complicated gearing due to the fact that the engine units pivoted. It was suggested that sandboxes mounted on top of the smokeboxes would require much simpler gearing.
 There was a risk of the engine bogies swinging right around in the event of a derailment and safety chains should be fitted to prevent that from happening.

A second Double Fairlie from the same builders, also with Walschaerts valve gear, was landed at East London in 1878 and incorporated all these suggested improvements except the water capacity, which remained the same. On this locomotive, the sandboxes were located around the bases of the chimneys.

Service
The first Double Fairlie locomotive was initially numbered E7 in the Eastern System's numbering sequence, but it was renumbered to E33 before 1878. The second Double Fairlie was numbered E34. While the various improvements on the second Double Fairlie locomotive proved to be effective and the engine performed well, it still offered cramped crew space and was therefore equally unpopular with enginemen, who considered it a clumsy locomotive to work.

The Double Fairlies were later taken off mainline work and employed as dock shunting engines in East London Harbour, working between the wharf and the goods sheds. They were both withdrawn and scrapped in 1903. No more of the type would be placed in service in South Africa.

References

0390
0-6-0+0-6-0 locomotives
C+C locomotives
Avonside locomotives
Cape gauge railway locomotives
Railway locomotives introduced in 1876
1876 in South Africa
Scrapped locomotives